The Idaho State Liquor Division is an agency of the government of the state of Idaho (hence an alcoholic beverage control state) which maintains a monopoly on the sale of all alcoholic beverages which exceed 16% alcohol by volume.

The current director of the division is Jeff Anderson, who was appointed to the office in 2010 by then-Governor Butch Otter. Anderson is also the director of the Idaho Lottery.

External links

References 

Liquor Dispensary
State alcohol agencies of the United States
Alcohol monopolies